This is an article about the computer game. For the Pharoahe Monch album, see W.A.R. (We Are Renegades).

W.A.R. is a video game produced by Martech. The BBC Micro version was written by Michael Archer while the Amstrad CPC version was written by John Edginton.

The Amstrad CPC version supported one of the first commercial mice in the form of the AMX Mouse.

References

1986 video games
Amstrad CPC games
BBC Micro and Acorn Electron games
Commodore 64 games
ZX Spectrum games
Video games scored by Rob Hubbard
Video games developed in the United Kingdom
Martech games
Single-player video games